Survival of the Fittest (2018) was a professional wrestling event produced by the American wrestling promotion Ring of Honor.  This was the 12th Survival of the Fittest tournament, and it took place on November 4, 2018, at the Express Live! in Columbus, Ohio.

Production

Background 

Survival of the Fittest is an annual tournament held by ROH. For the 2018 event, the winners from designated tournament matches advanced to a 6-Man Elimination Match and the winner of that match was declared Survivor of the Fittest, and received a future ROH World Championship match.

Production
Survival of The Fittest featured professional wrestling matches that involved wrestlers from pre-existing scripted feuds or storylines that played out on ROH's television program, Ring of Honor Wrestling. Wrestlers portrayed heroes (faces) or villains (heels) as they followed a series of events that built tension and culminated in a wrestling match or series of matches.

2018 Survival of the Fittest tournament participants

 Andrew Everett*
 Beer City Bruiser
 Christopher Daniels
 Colin Delaney*
 Dalton Castle
 Flip Gordon
 Guerrero Maya Jr.**
 Hangman Page
 Jonathan Gresham
 Luchasaurus*
 Marty Scurll
 PJ Black
 Silas Young
 Stuka Jr.**
 Tracy Williams

(*) - Free agent guest entrant

(**) - Works for Mexican promotion Consejo Mundial de Lucha Libre (CMLL), with which ROH has a partnership

Results

Order of Elimination
 Guerrero Maya Jr. was eliminated by PJ Black
 Jonathan Gresham was eliminated by Hangman Page
 PJ Black was eliminated by Marty Scurll
 Hangman Page was eliminated by Christopher Daniels
 Christopher Daniels was eliminated by Marty Scurll

References

   

2018 in professional wrestling
Events in Columbus, Ohio
2018 in Ohio
Professional wrestling in Columbus, Ohio
ROH Survival of the Fittest
November 2018 events in the United States